May 2013

See also

References

 05
May 2013 events in the United States